The 2011–12 Liga IV was the 70th season of the Liga IV, the fourth tier of the Romanian football league system. The champions of each county association play against one from a neighboring county in a play-off match played on a neutral venue. The winners of the play-off matches promoted to Liga III.

Promotion play-off
The matches was scheduled to be played on 20 June 2012.

|}

County leagues

Alba County

Arad County

Argeș County

Bacău County

Relegation play-off  
The 18th-placed team of the Liga IV faces the 2nd placed team from Liga V Bacău. The match played on 12 June 2011.

|}

Bihor County

Bistrița-Năsăud County

Botoșani County

Brașov County

Brăila County

Bucharest

Regular season

Seria 1

Seria 2

Championship play-off

Group 1 
All matches were played at Rocar Stadium in Bucharest on 24, 27 and 29 May 2013.

Group 2 
All matches were played at Romprim Stadium in Bucharest on 23, 25 and 28 May 2013.

Semi-finals

Final 

Chitila won the 2011–12 Liga IV Bucharest and qualify to promotion play-off in Liga III.

Buzău County

Series I

Series II

Series III

Championship play-off

Călărași County

Seria A

Seria B

Seria C

Relegation play-out

Championship play-off

Play-off round

Semifinals

Final 
The championship final was played on 16 June 2012 at Ion Comșa Stadium in Călărași.

Venus Independența won the 2011–12 Liga IV Călărași County and qualify to promotion play-off in Liga III.

Caraș-Severin County

Relegation play-off

Cluj County

Constanța County

East Series

West Series

Championship play-off  
The teams started the play-off with all the records achieved in the regular season, but without the results with the withdrawn teams Gloria Albești and Peștera. The teams played only against the teams from the other series

Championship play-out  
The teams started the play-out with all the records achieved in the regular season and played only against the teams from the other series.

Covasna County

Dâmbovița County

Dolj County

Regular season

Championship play-off  
The results between the qualified teams was maintained in the championship play-off.

Galați County

Giurgiu County

Championship play-off  
The championship play-off played between the best four ranked team in the regular season. All matches were played at Bolintin-Vale Stadium on 6 and 7 June (semi-finals) and 13 June 2012 (final).

Semi-finals

Final 

Avântul Florești won the 2011–12 Liga IV Giurgiu County and qualify to promotion play-off in Liga III.

Gorj County

Harghita County

Championship play-off

Play-off

Relegation play-off

Hunedoara County

Ialomița County

Iași County

Ilfov County

Championship play-off  
Championship play-off played in a single round-robin tournament between the best four teams of the regular season. The teams started the play-off with the following points: 1st place – 3 points, 2nd place – 2 points, 3rd place – 1 point, 4th place – 0 points.

Maramureș County

North Series

South Series

Championship final  

Plimob Sighetu Marmației won the 2011–12 Liga IV Maramureș County and qualify to promotion play-off in Liga III.

Mehedinți County

Mureș County

Neamț County

Olt County

Prahova County

Satu Mare County

Seria A

Seria B

Championship final  
The championship final was played on 9 June 2012 at Olimpia Stadium in Satu Mare.

''Someșul Cărășeu won the 2011–12 Liga IV Satu Mare County and qualify to promotion play-off in Liga III.

Sălaj County

Sibiu County

Suceava County

Teleorman County

Timiș County

Tulcea County

Vaslui County

Championship play-off  
Championship play-off was played in a double round-robin tournament between the best four teams of the regular season. The teams started the play-off with the following points: 1st place – 3 points, 2nd place – 2 points, 3rd place – 1 point, 4th place – 0 points.

Vâlcea County

Vrancea County

Seria Nord

Seria Sud

Championship play-off

Championship play-out

See also 
 2011–12 Liga I
 2011–12 Liga II
 2011–12 Liga III

References

External links
 FRF

Liga IV seasons
4
Romania